The 2022 Vietnamese National Cup (known as the BaF Meat-National Cup 2022 for sponsorship reasons) was the 30th edition of the Vietnamese Cup, the football knockout competition of Vietnam organized by the Vietnam Football Federation. Hanoi were the defending champions after winning 2020 Vietnamese Cup. The tournament follows the cancellation of the 2021 edition due to COVID-19 safety concerns. The champion will compete in the 2023–24 AFC Champions League play-off round as well as the 2023 Vietnamese Super Cup.

Access
25 teams from both V.League 1 and V.League 2 enter the competition, with 7 teams receiving a bye to Round 2 (with Hoang Anh Gia Lai and Viettel FC qualified for AFC Club Competitions in 2022 and 5 other teams following a random draw).

First round

Round of 16

Quarter-finals

Semi-finals

Finals

Brackets

Top Goalscorers

References

Vietnamese National Cup
Vietnam
Cup